Châu Phú is a rural district (huyện) of An Giang province in the Mekong Delta region of Vietnam. As of 2003, the district had a population of 244,305. The district covers an area of 426 km². The district capital lies at Cái Dầu. There are some festivals here, such as the "Bình Thủy temple worshiping" and the "Sir Tây An worshiping"

Châu Phú is located 20 km south of Long Xuyên and 20 km north of Châu Đốc, the main towns in the province.

The district comprises 12 communes and one thị trấn: Khánh Hòa, Mỹ Đức, Mỹ Phú, Ô Long Vĩ, Vĩnh Thạnh Trung, Thạnh Mỹ Tây, Bình Long, Đào Hữu Cảnh, Bình Phú, Bình Chánh, Bình Mỹ and thị trấn Cái Dầu.

The majority of the population follows the Hòa Hảo religious sect.

References

Districts of An Giang province
An Giang province